Helenopolis was a town and episcopal see in the former Roman province of Palaestina Secunda, in the Byzantine Empire.  It was named for the mother of Constantine the Great, Helena. It is identified as either modern Daburiyya or with Kfar Kama, both in Israel.

As a diocese that is no longer residential, it is listed in the Annuario Pontificio among titular sees of the Roman Catholic Church.  Its last titular bishop was John Francis Hackett.

References

Populated places of the Byzantine Empire
Archaeological sites in Israel
Catholic titular sees in Asia
Holy Land during Byzantine rule
Helena, mother of Constantine I
Byzantine sites in Asia